Hamadan (also Romanized as Hamadān) is a village in Keyvan Rural District, in the Central District of Khoda Afarin County, East Azerbaijan Province, Iran. At the 2006 census, its population was 126, in 41 families.

References 

Populated places in Khoda Afarin County